Federalist No. 1 is an essay by Alexander Hamilton, which became the first of a collection of essays named The Federalist Papers. It was published on October 27, 1787, under the pseudonym Publius. This paper provides the outline for the rest and argues for the inadequacy of the Articles of Confederation.

Response to anti-Federalists 
Federalist No. 1 introduces a series of essays published in the Independent Journal, the New-York Packet, and the Daily Advertiser as a response to Anti-Federalist opposition to the proposed US Constitution.  After the Constitutional Convention of 1787, the new Constitution was sent to the various states for ratification in September 1787. Anti-Federalist essays condemning the document began to surface later that month, quickly followed by the Federalist efforts of Alexander Hamilton, James Madison, and John Jay.

Opposition to the Articles of Confederation

The essay is highly critical of the government in place at the time; however, it does not take the form of a diatribe. , yet manifestly biased, Federalist No. 1 heaps praise upon the Constitution as an efficient system of government. Hamilton is quite aware of his own bias:

You will, no doubt, at the same time, have collected from the general scope of them, that [these ideas] proceed from a source not unfriendly to the new Constitution. Yes, my countrymen, I own to you that, after having given it an attentive consideration, I am clearly of opinion it is your interest to adopt it.
	
Hamilton is keenly aware not only of his own bias, but also those of others. In fact, Federalist No. 1, as an introductory essay, can be interpreted mainly as an attempt to impress upon readers that opinions will always contain bias when it comes to important matters such as this. Hamilton writes:

Happy will it be if our choice should be directed by a judicious estimate of our true interests, unperplexed and unbiased by considerations not connected with the public good. But this is a thing more ardently to be wished than seriously to be expected.

The investigation of particular types of bias is quite sophisticated. Hamilton identifies not only those with a venomous bias, but also the plethora of people who, while their intentions are good, exhibit an unmistakable bias. In fact, he claims even those who believe themselves to be impartial often have hidden biases:

It cannot be doubted that much of the opposition which has made its appearance, or may hereafter make its appearance, will spring from sources, blameless at least, if not respectable — the honest errors of minds led astray by preconceived jealousies and fears.

More importantly, the discussion of bias actually introduces a key theme of the Federalist as a whole, the relation of motive and reason in politics. Hamilton, as Publius, argues that political motives are irrelevant to the truth of arguments made in their behalf. Arguments stand or fall of their own weight and can be neither enhanced nor diminished by knowledge of the motives that gave rise to them. The irrelevance of motives to the truth of arguments is one of the main reasons that the authors of these papers chose to use a pseudonym.

Political discord 

Hamilton, predicting the initial Anti-Federalist response would continue, correctly foresaw the US Constitution as a polarizing issue. In reference to those who would oppose the Constitution, he claimed, "A torrent of angry and malignant passions will be let loose." According to Hamilton:

An enlightened zeal for the energy and efficiency of government will be stigmatized as the offspring of a temper fond of despotic power and hostile to the principles of liberty.

This is a particularly key warning from Hamilton against the populist arguments of Anti-Federalists, who he predicted (quite rightly, as this is seen in libertarian political discourse even today) would paint the utility and efficiency of a central government as an infringement of personal liberties. Hamilton maintained that he held a genuine duty to the citizens, in setting them on their guards against a barrage of political spin:

I have had an eye, my fellow-citizens, to putting you upon your guard against all attempts, from whatever quarter, to influence your decision in a matter of the utmost moment to your welfare.

Rejecting the current government 

The essay's major thrust is to impress upon citizens that the system that was in place prior to the Constitution was not worth keeping. Many would view this as a tall order; it can be hard to convince someone to replace something unless it is entirely broken. Hamilton never underestimated the gravity of the decision people were faced with. He met it head on in his introductory prose:

It has been frequently remarked that it seems to have been reserved to the people of this country, by their conduct and example, to decide the important question, whether societies of men are really capable or not of establishing good government from reflection and choice, or whether they are forever destined to depend for their political constitutions on accident and force. If there be any truth in the remark, the crisis at which we are arrived may with propriety be regarded as the era in which that decision is to be made; and a wrong election of the part we shall act may, in this view, deserve to be considered as the general misfortune of mankind.

Hamilton felt that it was important to let the citizens choose who ran the government. Democracy ultimately destroys corruption.

Supporting the new Constitution 

As a consequence of encouraging people to reject the old system, Hamilton supported the new Constitution at all costs. He went so far as to say the only viable alternatives were either a ratification of the Constitution or a complete dissolution of the existing Union. This conclusion was justified by referring to the Anti-Federalists, who claimed that the 13 members of the Union had already made for an unwieldy system and that governance depended on breaking the federal government into smaller, regional chunks. Hamilton thought this view so pernicious and outlandish that he encouraged its propagation so that 
all citizens could see how bizarre the Anti-Federalists' views were (bizarre according to Hamilton, that is).

A series of concepts 

Hamilton outlines six key concepts discussed in the Federalist Papers:

 The utility of the Union to prosperity
 The insufficiency of the existing confederation to preserve the Union
 The necessity of a government as powerful as that proposed, to meet this object
 The conformity of the proposed Constitution with the true principles of Republican government
 The Constitution's analogy to various state Constitutions
 The additional security a Constitution will provide to the preservation of government in those states, and to the preservation of liberty and property

References

External links 

 Text of The Federalist No. 1: congress.gov

01
Federalist No. 01
1787 essays
1787 in the United States